Larry is a 1974 American drama film starring Frederic Forrest and Tyne Daly. It is based on Robert T. McQueen's 1973 book Larry: Case History of a Mistake

Plot 
A man wrongly confined in a mental hospital for his first 26 years, who is discovered to have average intelligence. Upon being released, a social worker guides him in his learning process of how to cope with the real world.

Selected cast
 Frederic Forrest as Larry Herman
 Tyne Daly as Nancy Hockworth
 Michael McGuire as Dr. McCabe
 Robert Walden as Tom Corman
 Katherine Helmond as Maureen Whitten

References

External links
 
 
 

1974 films
1974 drama films
1974 television films
1970s English-language films
Films about intellectual disability
Films directed by William Graham (director)